El Sheikh Sa'id is a small village in the Minya Governorate in Upper Egypt. Situated on the east bank of the Nile, it is named after a local Muslim saint buried in the area.

Overview
El Sheikh Sa'id comprises the rock-cut tombs of the nomarchs of the Hare nome (the 15th Upper Egyptian nome) from the 6th Dynasty. These tombs are cut in steep cliffs. The use of this necropolis declined during the First Intermediate Period, when the nomarchial necropolis was transferred slightly northward to Deir El Bersha.

References

Populated places in Minya Governorate
Cemeteries in Egypt